The 1961 National 400 was a NASCAR Grand National Series stock car race that was held on October 15, 1961, at Charlotte Motor Speedway in Concord, North Carolina.

The transition to purpose-built racecars began in the early 1960s and occurred gradually over that decade.  Changes made to the sport by the late 1960s brought an end to the "strictly stock" vehicles of the 1950s.

Background
Around 35,821 spectators traveled to Charlotte Motor Speedway to watch the race. Located in Concord, North Carolina, Charlotte Motor Speedway is a banked  quad-oval that opened in 1960 for the inaugural World 600. Construction for the track began in 1959 with Bruton Smith and Curtis Turner as architects for the speedway.

Race report

David Pearson, Fireball Roberts and Junior Johnson would dominate the early portion of the race. Ken Rush was credited with the last-place finish due to problems with his rocker arm on lap 16 out of this 267-lap event. Junior Johnson's top ten finish came as a result of a problem with one of his wheels on lap 256; he was destined for a top five finish until he encountered that problem.

Notable crew chiefs in the event; included Smokey Yunick, Bud Allman, Shorty Johns and Ray Fox.

Most of the vehicles in the race were either Pontiacs or Fords. Junior Johnson, Bob Welborn and Fireball Roberts would be the leaders during the middle portion of the race.

Fireball Roberts' vehicle would suffer severe damage after blowing a right front tire on lap 113. Roberts wasn't injured."

Joe Weatherly would eventually gain the lead on lap 263 and beat Richard Petty by almost two car lengths. This would be the seventh of nine wins for Joe Weatherly in the 1961 NASCAR Grand National Series season. He ended on a hot-streak, winning the next race and then the last race of the 1961 NASCAR Cup Series season as well. Joe Weatherly made four pit stops during the race, one unscheduled. He put on one or more new tires each time. He was the only of the top-10 starters in the top-10 finishers' list. Four caution flags, one for 12 laps, helped the Norfolk veteran to stay in contention.

Individual race winnings for each driver ranged from the winner's share of $9,510 ($ when adjusted for inflation) to the last-place finishers' share of $275 ($ when adjusted for inflation). The total prize purse offered for this event was $42,050 ($ when adjusted for inflation).

Qualifying

Top 10 finishers

Timeline
Section reference: 
 Start of race: David Pearson had the pole position to begin the event.
 Lap 4: Fireball Roberts took over the lead from David Pearson.
 Lap 27: Curtis Crider fell out with engine failure; Nelson Stacy managed to overheat his vehicle.
 Lap 38: Tubby Gonzales fell out with engine failure.
 Lap 42: Bunkie Blackburn had a terminal crash.
 Lap 54: Banjo Matthews fell out with engine failure.
 Lap 55: Bobby Johns had a terminal crash.
 Lap 74: David Pearson took over the lead from Fireball Roberts.
 Lap 75: Junior Johnson took over the lead from David Pearson.
 Lap 77: Fireball Roberts took over the lead from Junior Johnson.
 Lap 111: Bill Morgan had a terminal crash.
 Lap 113: Fireball Roberts had a terminal crash.
 Lap 114: Junior Johnson took over the lead from Fireball Roberts.
 Lap 136: Marvin Panch had a terminal crash.
 Lap 140: Bob Welborn took over the lead from Junior Johnson.
 Lap 169: Elmo Langley fell out with engine failure.
 Lap 180: Junior Johnson took over the lead from Bob Welborn.
 Lap 197: Bob Welborn took over the lead from Junior Johnson.
 Lap 198: Junior Johnson took over the lead from Bob Welborn.
 Lap 200: Bob Welborn took over the lead from Junior Johnson.
 Lap 204: Junior Johnson took over the lead from Bob Welborn.
 Lap 223: Ned Jarrett fell out with engine failure.
 Lap 252: Speedy Thompson fell out with engine failure.
 Lap 257: Bob Welborn took over the lead from Junior Johnson
 Lap 263: Joe Weatherly took over the lead from Bob Welborn
 Finish: Joe Weatherly was officially declared the winner of the event

References

National 400
National 400
NASCAR races at Charlotte Motor Speedway